John Brownlow  (4 July 1805 - 24 May 1882) was an Anglican priest in Ireland during the 19th century.

Brownlow was born in Dublin and educated at Trinity College, Dublin. He was for many years the incumbent at Ardbraccan; and Dean of Clonmacnoise  from 1862 until his death.

References

Alumni of Trinity College Dublin
Deans of Clonmacnoise
Christian clergy from Dublin (city)
Church of Ireland priests
19th-century Irish Anglican priests
1805 births
1882 deaths